The 2008 All-Ireland Senior Football Championship was that year's Gaelic football championship, having thrown-in on 11 May 2008 and concluded with the All-Ireland final at Croke Park on 21 September 2008. Tyrone beat Kerry in the decider.

The draw for the provincial championships took place on 14 October 2007.

Results

Munster Senior Football Championship

Top Scorer: D Goulding (Cork); 1-08

Leinster Senior Football Championship

Top Scorer: A Brogan (Dublin); 2-12

Connacht Senior Football Championship

Top Scorer: E Mulligan (Leitrim); 0-20

Ulster Senior Football Championship

Top Scorer: S McDonnell; 1-17

All-Ireland qualifiers

Round 1
The first round of the All-Ireland Qualifier Series included all the counties that did not qualify for their respective provincial final with the exceptions of Antrim, Carlow, Clare, Kilkenny, Leitrim, London, Sligo, Waterford and Wicklow. (These nine teams played in the Tommy Murphy Cup as a result of their participation in Division 4 of the 2009 National Football League.)

The sixteen teams competing in the first round were Cavan, Derry, Donegal, Down, Kildare, Laois, Limerick, Longford, Louth, Meath, Monaghan, Offaly, Roscommon, Tipperary, Tyrone and Westmeath. Unlike previous years, teams that played each other in their provincial championships were permitted to meet again in the qualifiers. The first round draw took place on 29 June 2008. The first team drawn had home venue provided their ground meets the minimum safety requirements. The first round of games took place on 19 July 2008.

Round 2
The second round featured the eight winning teams from the first round in an open draw. The second round draw took place on 20 July 2008.  As in the first round, the first drawn team had home advantage. These games were played on 26 July 2008.

Round 3
In the third round, the four winning teams from the second round were drawn against the four losing provincial finalists. The third round draw took place on 27 July 2008.  Venues were decided by the Central Competitions Control Committee. These games were played on 2 and 3 August 2008.  The winners of these games went on to play the four provincial champions in the All-Ireland quarter-finals.

All-Ireland series
This stage of the competition is a pure knockout, with teams competing facing off in a single match. The draw for the quarter finals took place on August 3, and it involved the four winning teams from round 3 of the qualifier series being drawn against the four provincial winners; Galway, Cork, Dublin and Armagh.

Quarter-finals

Semi-finals

Final

Championship statistics

Miscellaneous

 Fermanagh reached Ulster final for the first time since 1982.
 Wexford reached the Leinster final for the first time since 1956 and the All Ireland semi-final for the first time since 1945.
 The Munster football championship was seeded for the first time since 1990.
 This was the first time that neither All Ireland finalist won their provincial championship since the introduction of the back door.

Top scorers

Season

Single game

Discipline

See also
 2008 All-Ireland Senior Hurling Championship

External links
 All-Ireland SFC Results